Gotcha, a colloquial contraction for "got you" (got ya), may refer to:

Film and TV
 Gotcha! (film), a 1985 film starring Anthony Edwards and Linda Fiorentino
 "Gotcha!" (Adventure Time), an episode of Adventure Time
 "Gotcha" (Entourage episode), an episode of  American television series Entourage
 "Gotcha", an episode of British TV series Coupling
 "Gotcha", a practical joke performed on a celebrity on the television show, Noel's House Party

Games
 Gotcha (video game), a 1973 arcade game
 Gotcha! (1995 video game)
 Gotcha! The Sport!, a 1987 video game
 Gotcha! Extreme Paintball, a 2004 video game
 Assassin (game), a live action game (also known as Gotcha)

Journalism
 "Gotcha", a controversial frontpage headline which appeared in The Sun newspaper on 4 May 1982 about the ARA General Belgrano sinking
 Gotcha journalism, a newspaper reporting style

Music

Songs
 "Gotcha" (song), a 2012 song by Jessica Mauboy
 "Gotcha", theme song of the Starsky & Hutch TV series by Tom Scott
 "Gotcha ", a 1982 song by Crass
 "Gotcha ", a song by Mumzy Stranger from his 2008 mixtape

Other music
 Gotcha! (album), a 1999 album by Salsa band DLG
 Gotcha! (band), a Dutch funk band
 Gotcha! (quartet), a barbershop quartet

Other uses
 Gotcha (company), an American electric bike and scooter-sharing company
 Gotcha (programming), a counter-intuitive, but documented, behavior in a computer system (as opposed to a bug)
 Gotcha Tchogovadzé (born 1941), Georgian ambassador

See also
 Gacha (disambiguation)